Arthur John Clifton (20 August 1897 – 1975) was a British boxer. He competed in the men's heavyweight event at the 1924 Summer Olympics.

Clifton won the Amateur Boxing Association 1924 heavyweight title, when boxing out of the PLA Police ABC.

References

External links
 

1897 births
1975 deaths
British male boxers
Olympic boxers of Great Britain
Boxers at the 1924 Summer Olympics
Boxers from Greater London
Heavyweight boxers